Bon Voyage is a musical duo consisting of Jason Martin of Starflyer 59 and his wife, Julie.

History
The duo first appeared in 1995 when they released Issue 1, a 7" recording on Jeff Cloud's record label Velvet Blue Music. They appeared again in 1996 when they released a follow up 7", Issue 2.

By 1998, Bon Voyage had signed on to BEC Records to release their first CD, entitled Bon Voyage.

The group dropped off until 2002 when Tooth & Nail Records released The Right Amount. The group worked with Tooth & Nail again to release their 2008 album Lies.

Members
Core members
 Julie Martin - vocals
 Jason Martin - guitar

Additional members
 Steve Dail – bass
 Mike Perez - synthesizer, drum programming

Former members
 Ronnie Martin - synthesizers (2002)
 Richard Swift - keys (2002)
 Gene Eugene – keys (1998)
 Matt McCartie – drums (1998)
 Travis Zimmerman – bass (1998)
 Carlos Colon - synthesizers (live) (1998)
 Joey Esquibel - drums (live) (1998)

Discography

Studio albums
Bon Voyage (1998)
The Right Amount (2002)
Lies (2008)

Singles
Issue 1 (7") (1995)
Issue II (7") (1996)

Compilations
Caribbean Sea (Demo) Velvet Blue Music - 12 Song Sampler (1997)
Holly Jolly Christmas Happy Christmas (1998)
The Little Christmas Tree Happy Christmas Vol. 5 (2010)

External links

Tooth & Nail Records artists
Indie pop groups from California